Orya (Oria, or erroneously Uria) is a Papuan language spoken in Indonesia. Warpok is the Nimboran name.

Phonology

References

Languages of western New Guinea
Orya–Tor languages